Cheung Sha Wan Abattoir is a former slaughterhouse in Cheung Sha Wan, in the Sham Shui Po District of Hong Kong.

It was closed in 1999.

Cheung Sha Wan Abattoir, together with the slaughterhouses in Kennedy Town and Yuen Long were closed for economic reasons as well as their proximity to urban areas. They were replaced by Sheung Shui Slaughterhouse.

References

Cheung Sha Wan